Makhinovsky is a rural locality (a khutor) in Novokiyevskoye Rural Settlement, Novoanninsky District, Volgograd Oblast, Russia. The population was 71 as of 2010. There are 4 streets.

Geography 
Makhinovsky is located in steppe on the Khopyorsko-Buzulukskaya Plain, 53 km southeast of Novoanninsky (the district's administrative centre) by road. Novokiyevka is the nearest rural locality.

References 

Rural localities in Novoanninsky District